"You Are My High" is a song that was originally released in 1999 by Artist DEMON. French DJ and record producer DJ Snake then released a remix that soared in popularity on 28 July 2021. The remix was written by Charlie Wilson, Johnsye Andrea Smith, Ronnie Wilson and DJ Snake, and produced by the latter.

Background
DJ Snake produced the track with Malaa in July 2021. It also marks their second collaboration since "Selfish Love" with Selena Gomez in March, and his first solo release since "Trust Nobody" in Summer 2020.

Composition
"You Are My High" is sample from the single "You Are My High" by The Gap Band, and merges elements of "traditional dance music, classic R&B and funk." The song also borrows heavily from a similarly titled track released in 2000 by French artist Demon.

Credits and personnel
Credits adapted from AllMusic.

 DJ Snake – producer, musical Producer, primary artist, composer, programming
 DJ Mercer – mixing
 Johnsye Andrea Smith – composer
 Charlie Wilson – composer
 ARonnie Wilson – composer

Charts

Weekly charts

Year-end charts

Release history

References

2021 songs
2021 singles
DJ Snake songs
Songs written by DJ Snake
Songs written by Charlie Wilson (singer)
Interscope Records singles